Military rations, operational rations, or military provisions are goods issued to sustain the needs of military personnel. As their name suggests, military rations have historically been, and often still are, subject to rationing, with each individual receiving specific amounts from available supplies. Military-issued goods and the rationing of such goods has existed since the beginnings of organized warfare.

Though often associated with food and drink rations, "military ration" may also refer to other types of items that are rationed for military personnel, such as fuel, alcohol, or consumer goods. Ration acquisition may be managed using allowances or a ration card, or they may be issued without charge.

Military rations are a key component of military nutrition, the field and study of nutrition in the military. Significant research goes into creating military rations, including the nutrition and energy of rations, food spoilage prevention, what meals should be offered, the amount of food each ration should contain, and the exact specifications of each meal and ingredient.

Types

Field ration 

A field ration (known under a variety of other names, such as combat ration, operational ration, or meal ready to eat) is a military ration intended to provide nutrition and sustenance in the field, in combat, at the front line, or where eating facilities are otherwise unavailable.

Field rations can be categorized into two main types:

 Individual rations, designed and intended to sustain a single person
 Group rations, designed and intended to sustain multiple personnel

Garrison ration 

A garrison ration is a type of military ration that, depending on its use and context, could refer to rations issued to personnel at a camp, installation, or other garrison; allowance allotted to personnel to purchase goods or rations sold in a garrison (or the rations purchased with allowance); a type of ration; or a combined system with distinctions and differences depending on situational factors (such as whether the country is at peace or at war).

History

Ancient and antiquity 

In ancient warfare, militaries generally lived off the land, relying on whatever food they could forage, steal, purchase, or requisition.

In Mesopotamia, most workers, including soldiers, were given rations of barley, oil, and wool. In ancient Egypt, soldiers brought whatever they could carry in battle, but ate well while in their camps. In ancient Rome, soldiers relied on wheat, which was replaced with barley as punishment. Each soldier had an allotted amount of food they could have, such as one pound of meat daily; the size of a Roman legion meant dozens, if not hundreds of animals could be killed daily to sustain their needs. Chinese soldiers of the Han dynasty ate rice, wheat, sorghum, and other grains, smashed and fried in a manner similar to modern fried rice and fried noodles. Soldiers of the Byzantine Empire were trained in sustaining their food supplies for as long as 20 days, with many also carrying small hand mills to grind grain to make paximathia.

Post-classical 
In medieval warfare, military feeding remained essentially the same as it had been in prior centuries.

Tang dynasty soldiers ate primarily millet porridge, but before a deployment, they would have a large and elaborate banquet, with another large meal before a battle. During the Crusades, crusaders brought grain with them, but otherwise relied on their own food storages, purchased food from locals and, by the late Crusades, supplies brought in by Venetian vessels and merchants. However, their food supplies were consistently low, to the point that in several battles crusaders would "stop fighting and start eating" upon discovering food in the camps of Muslim armies. The armies of the Mongol Empire only had whatever food or livestock they brought from home, and relied on whatever food they could pillage. Ottoman Empire Janissaries were some of the most well-fed soldiers of the era, with access to a variety of foods. The Ottoman military greatly relied on bread and biscuits, with around 105 ovens in Istanbul dedicated solely to baking for military purposes.

In feudal Japan and the Sengoku period, military nutrition habits depended on the daimyo commanding them:

 Mōri Motonari issued each soldier a bag of rice, fried rice, and mochi, the latter of which was chosen due to its portability, long shelf life, ability to provide high energy in small amounts, and Motonari's personal preference for it.
 Uesugi Kenshin would prepare massive feasts for his army before battles, known as kachidoki-meshi ("victory cry meals"), featuring delicacies such as "a mountain of rice ... black-boiled abalone, vinegar-washed fish and jellyfish sashimi, soups with seasonal vegetables and dried fish, walnut-roasted duck, simmered sand borer, and more", though Kenshin himself was noted to eat very little. During battles, Kenshin assembled supply convoys called konidatai staffed by peasants, who would deliver supplies and rations to troops.
 Toyotomi Hideyoshi is said to have regularly distributed food rations out to his officers and soldiers, and kept them well-fed. In one instance, while traveling from Ogaki to Nagahama (a 52 kilometer distance) in 1583, Hideyoshi sent scouts ahead to each village to ask that they prepare rice for Hideyoshi's army; the villages set out rice balls for the soldiers, allowing them to remain fed for the entire trip.

In general, Japanese soldiers would bring uchigaibukuro, pouches used to store rice and medicine, into battle with them. They would also eat miso, dried taro stalk, and okayu as part of a soup prepared in a soldier's jingasa. Soldiers and ninja also used "pills", small ball-shaped medicinal rations consumed in emergencies or long missions, of which there were three types: hyorogan ("ration pills"), made with various flours, sugary substances, and spices to provide quick energy; kikatsugan ("hunger pills"), made with starchy ingredients to provide endurance; and suikitsugan ("thirst pills"), made from umeboshi, bakumondoto, and sugar to encourage saliva production.

Song dynasty soldiers were issued money to buy food, pickles, salt, and other food items, though grain supply issues meant they relied less on grain rations than in prior generations. By the Ming dynasty, sesame seed cakes, which could last long periods of time, became standard military food; additionally, the imperial government spent significant amounts of money on the military, ensuring they had plenty of food.

Early modern 

By the era of early modern warfare, military food had improved to a relatively significant degree.

The British Empire's Royal Navy relied on hardtack, salted meat, and alcoholic drinks (originally beer but later rum). The Continental Army of the Revolutionary War-era United States had, on paper, plentiful rations including salted meat, legumes, grains, bread, milk, and alcohol, with jerky and hardtack if those foods were not available. However, in reality, the Continental Army had difficulties supplying their units, and soldiers reportedly had to beg civilians for food. The situation deteriorated to the point that the U.S. Congress pressured George Washington to permit the seizure of food, but he declined, fearing it would alienate the colonials.

During the Napoleonic Wars, the Grande Armée strongly relied on bread—24 ounces standard if well-supplied, compared to a mere half-pound of meat and 2 ounces of legumes—but "spent most of their time desperately hungry", relying on doughboys and "out of the ground" crops such as potatoes and corn, which required minimal cooking and had recently become common across European farms.

During French and Indian War, a theatre of the Seven Years' War, the British had a detailed ration system. The Crimean War saw issues with supplying soldiers in battle. In the British Army, rations were regularly halved, and many soldiers developed scurvy, to the point that the hospital in Scutari received more soldiers for scurvy than battle wounds. During the American Civil War, the food and rations of the Union Army and the Confederate States Army were meant to be mostly the same—meat, cornmeal, vegetables, vinegar, molasses, and hardtack—but supply issues plagued the Confederates as the war continued, forcing them to live off the land.

Shortly before the Napoleonic Wars, French government offered a 12,000 franc reward to invent a reliable food preservation method for the military. Nicolas Appert, a French confectioner operating a food bottling factory in Massy, Essonne, offered his bottling method and published a book detailing the process in 1810. Appert's bottling method was later developed into canning, improved when Peter Durand invented the tin can the same year, which became the standard for storing food using Appert's method. The development of pasteurization by Louis Pasteur also improved military rations.

Modern 

The era of modern warfare saw significant improvements in the shelf life, variety, and quality of military rations and nutrition.

In World War I, both Allied and Central Powers soldiers had relatively sufficient food supplies due to the static nature of trench warfare. British, French, Canadian, and ANZAC soldiers were regularly issued "dull" foods such as bully beef, biscuits, pudding, and Maconochie (tinned meat, potato, and vegetable stew), the latter of which was panned for its poor quality, especially if not sufficiently heated. British Indian Army soldiers reportedly ate very well compared to their European comrades, with regular access to fresh food such as goat meat and rotis; British logistics also accommodated for vegetarian Indians by providing them with dal, gur, and milk instead of meat. This treatment was supposedly to prevent a mutiny similar to the Indian Rebellion of 1857, which was partially caused by indifference to Indian religious needs. The American Expeditionary Forces had a variety of different rations issued to them, organized based on freshness and purpose, and were generally considered well-fed compared to their British Empire contemporaries. Imperial German Army soldiers had mostly the same things, but with reliance on potatoes over grains. As the war progressed and food supplies lowered due to restrictions, the German military was forced to gradually reduce their meat rations, instituting meat-free days once per week and making meat a rarity among German soldiers.

By World War II, rations had taken modern organized forms for both the Allies and the Axis. The U.S. military revised their World War I-era ration organization system into an alphabetized system: A-rations of fresh food, B-rations of packaged unprepared food, C-rations of prepared canned food, D-rations of chocolate, and K-rations of three-course meals. British soldiers were issued 24-hour rations intended to sustain troops until composite rations and fresh food could be supplied by field kitchens. On the home front in Britain, mobile canteens were operated to feed Home Guard and civil defence authorities hot food and fresh tea. Red Army soldiers received rye bread, potatoes, vegetables, pasta, meat, and fish (in order of quantity). The Chinese Second United Front had ample food supplies, but food was strained after 1940, when food panics and requirements for peasants to feed Chinese soldiers led to agricultural failures and severe inflation. The German Wehrmacht received basic rations of hard bread and canned meat (usually pork, roast beef, turkey, or chicken, though Fleischkonserve—literally translated as "can of meat"—went unidentified), though canned tomato soup, condensed milk, and Erbswurst (a compact peasemeal sausage that can be dissolved to make pea soup) were also common. Elite units such as the Fallschirmjäger received more unique high-energy food, including tins of cheese and sausage. The Schutzstaffel received four-day rations consisting of Graubrot, canned meat, vegetables, spreads, coffee, and cigarettes (despite the SS's strong anti-smoking stance). Regions invaded and occupied by Nazi forces were stripped of their food to feed Germans and starve local populations. The Imperial Japanese Army and Navy received rather basic rations that were intended to be eaten alongside other foraged food. The Royal Italian Army ate mainly pasta, bread, oatmeal, meat, fish, broth, and salad from their field kitchens, with alcohol also regularly issued. However, on deployment, Italian soldiers mostly received low-quality canned food and biscuits, with regular supplies of food strained by logistical issues during the North African campaign.

Most modern and currently-issued rations were developed during and after the Cold War. The Soviet Armed Forces issued their personnel a very basic ration of tushonka, bread or crackers, and condensed milk, with little variety. Both the West German Bundeswehr and the East German National People's Army issued 24-hour rations containing four meals each, though their contents and types varied. The U.S. military, initially issuing the canned Meal, Combat, Individual (similar to the C-ration) from the late 1950s through the Vietnam War, developed the Meal, Ready-to-Eat (MRE) in 1983, designed to provide easy-to-prepare individual meals in retort pouches that could last for very long periods of time. The British 24-hour ration gradually advanced from tinned rations to freeze-dried and vacuum-sealed rations.

See also 

 Armed Forces Recipe Service
 Army Catering Corps
 History of military nutrition in the United States
 Humanitarian daily ration
 Mess kit

References

External links 

 
 
Military food
History of food and drink